Freedom Township is a township in Waseca County, Minnesota, United States. The population was 397 at the 2000 census.

Freedom Township was organized in 1858.

Geography

Demographics
As of the census of 2000, there were 397 people, 147 households, and 120 families residing in the township.  The population density was 11.0 people per square mile (4.3/km2).  There were 153 housing units at an average density of 4.3/sq mi (1.6/km2).  The racial makeup of the township was 99.24% White, and 0.76% from two or more races. Hispanic or Latino of any race were 1.01% of the population.

There were 147 households, out of which 34.7% had children under the age of 18 living with them, 76.2% were married couples living together, 3.4% had a female householder with no husband present, and 17.7% were non-families. 16.3% of all households were made up of individuals, and 9.5% had someone living alone who was 65 years of age or older.  The average household size was 2.70 and the average family size was 3.03.

In the township the population was spread out, with 25.7% under the age of 18, 6.0% from 18 to 24, 28.0% from 25 to 44, 22.7% from 45 to 64, and 17.6% who were 65 years of age or older.  The median age was 40 years. For every 100 females, there were 111.2 males.  For every 100 females age 18 and over, there were 103.4 males.

The median income for a household in the township was $39,375, and the median income for a family was $43,929. Males had a median income of $30,179 versus $19,375 for females. The per capita income for the township was $14,678.  About 1.9% of families and 4.4% of the population were below the poverty line, including 3.9% of those under age 18 and 7.0% of those age 65 or over.

References

Townships in Waseca County, Minnesota
Townships in Minnesota